Stropharia pseudocyanea is a mushroom in the family Strophariaceae.

References

Strophariaceae
Fungi of Europe
Fungi described in 1823